Jacob Balthasar Peeters, also known as Jacob Peeters or Jacobus Peeters (1660-61 – after 1721) was a Flemish painter who specialized in architectural paintings depicting imaginary Renaissance and Baroque palaces populated with elegant figures wearing exotic clothes and headgear and shown in theatrical, stage-like postures. Peeters also painted realistic interiors of existing churches with staffage.

Life
Very little is known about the life and career of Jacob Balthasar Peeters. Some confusion about the facts of his life is caused by the fact that the name Jacob or Jacobus Peeters was quite common at the time, and there appears to have been at least one other contemporary Jacobus Peeters who was also a painter active in Antwerp.  It is not clear when or where he was born.  As he was mentioned as being 22 years old in a document dated 28 May 1683, he must have been born in 1660 or 1661.  He was likely born in Antwerp as his father Daniel was a master of the Antwerp Guild of Saint Luke. His mother was Martina Wouters.

A Jacobus Peeters was registered in the guild year 1672-72 at the Antwerp Guild of Saint Luke as a pupil of the painter Peter van de Velde.  A Jacobus Peeters is also mentioned as a pupil in the guild year 1675–76.It is not clear with which of these pupils Jacob Balthasar Peeters should be identified but it is more likely he was the latter one. On 28 May 1683, his mother and the marine and landscape painter Hendrik van Minderhout entered into a one-year contract pursuant to which van Minderhout was to teach Jacob to draw and paint. The contract further stipulated that "He will learn for a year, in the summer from 7am to 6pm, in the winter from 8am until the fall of darkness.  He will paint landscapes and staffage.  Outside of his working hours he is allowed to draw, sketch and paint after the works of his master, also on Sundays and holidays, for his own profit.  The cost is 100 guilder, a possible second term costs 15 Flemish pounds.

In the guild year 1688–1689 Peeters became a master in the Guild as a 'wijnmeester', i.e. the son of a master. Elected in 1695 to serve as dean of the Guild, he preferred to pay the fixed contribution of 360 guilders to be exempted from this charge.  He may possibly be identified with the Jacobus Peeters constschilder (painter) who makes together with his wife Barbara Christina Witten a will on 7 June 1699, while living on Kipdorp near the St. James Church. If that is the case, the couple had at least one son Henricus Josephus who was an Augustine monk in Antwerp. 

His pupils included Jan-Baptist van Isschot, Jan Baptist van der Straeten, Jan Carel Vierpeyl, Rombaut Bacx and Nicolaas Gillis.

The date and place of his death are not known.  The artist is usually described as being active from circa 1673 to circa 1721 in Antwerp. A pair of paintings depicting the interiors of the Jesuit Church in Antwerp and signed and dated 1721 are evidence that the artist was still alive in that year.  If he is the Jacobus Peeter who was the widower of Barbara Christina Witten, he made his will as a widower on 20 November 1753, when he must have been already 92 or 93 years of age.

Work
Jacob Balthasar Peeters was a specialist painter of imaginary Renaissance and Baroque palaces and paintings of existing churches.  Peeters would place among these imaginary or existing structures and outdoor settings elegant figures, usually wearing exotic hats and costumes, together with their, often black, pages and with dogs running around.

As was common practice in Antwerp artistic practice of that period, Peeters collaborated with other artists.  A pair of paintings depicting Fantastic courtly architecture with staffage (Hampel Munich auction of 25 September 2014, lot 679) constitute a collaborative effort of Peeters and Hendrik van Minderhout. Van Minderhout was a Dutch painter active in Antwerp who often contributed the figures to works by local landscape and perspective painters including Wilhelm Schubert van Ehrenberg. The aforementioned pair of pictures, which were made to be hung next to each other, demonstrate the fantastic, almost surreal, aspects of Peeters' imaginary views. One of the canvases provides an idealized view of a palace with round arched loggias supported by columns and the other of a courtly façade with a portico and a balustrade on top.  The buildings are placed respectively on the left and right and disappear in the distance with foreshortening at the rear.  Each painting continues onto a view of an idealized park landscape with a large pond on which float pleasure ships with swans as figureheads.  The backdrop is a blue sky with brightly lit, white-gray clouds. The artist enlivened the scene by having light fall through the loggia arches, which contrasts with the architectural façade, which is in the shade.  Groups of figures in the foreground include ladies and gentlemen who are as fanciful as the architecture.  The figures are shown in theatrical, stage-like postures, some engaged in conversation.  The ladies have towering hairdos and the gentlemen wear turbans or feathered helmets. A black servant carries the train of one of the ladies' dresses.  A guard holding a lance is reclining against the façade of one of the palaces.  Some dogs are running among these figures.

Jacob Balthasar Peeters painted a number of church interiors including of the Jesuit churches of Bruges and Antwerp.  This theme was popular in the Low Countries throughout the 17th century.  Antwerp artists preferred depicting interiors of high baroque interiors while Dutch artists concentrated on the barren interiors of Protestant churches despoiled of their decorations.  In comparison to the earlier church interiors of Flemish and Dutch masters, Peeters' church interiors reflect 18th century artistic preferences through the addition of elegant figures and their attention to detail. One pair of works in the Statens Museum for Kunst in Copenhagen dated 1714 depicts the interior of the Jesuit St. Charles Borromeo Church in Antwerp.  A pair of views of the same church were recently on the art market (Lempertz Cologne auction of 19 November 2016).  The works created in 1721 show the church in the state before part of its decoration was destroyed by fire on 18 July 1718.  In the fire, the interior of the church, including ceiling murals painted by Peter Paul Rubens, was destroyed.  Peeters was able to include the lost decorations in these two compositions by using his own compositions which predated the fire such as the works now in the Statens Museum for Kunst.

Peeters' work shows a strong similarity with other Flemish architecture painters of his time such as Jacobus Ferdinandus Saey and Peeters' own pupil Jan Baptist van der Straeten. The similarities are such that the works of these artists can often not be easily distinguished from each other. A painting depicting the Courtyard of Rubens' House in Antwerp (Buckinghamshire County Museum, Aylesbury) was possibly painted by Jacob Balthasar Peeters or Anton Gunther Gheringh, another architectural painter active in Antwerp.

Notes

External links

Flemish Baroque painters
Flemish genre painters
Flemish landscape painters
Artists from Antwerp
Painters from Antwerp
1650s births
18th-century deaths
Year of death uncertain